Islam Q&A is an Islamic da‘wah website that offers answers to questions about Islam based on the interpretations of the Qur'an and Sunnah (including hadith) literature by its founder and its superviser Muhammad Al-Munajjid, an adherent of the Salafi-Wahhabi movement.

History 
The service was one of the first online fatwa services, if not the first. The launching of IslamQA.info in 1997 by Muhammad Al-Munajjid marked the beginning of an attempt to answer questions according to the Sunni interpretation of the Quran and Hadith. The website states that "All questions and answers on this site have been prepared, approved, revised, edited, amended or annotated by Shaykh Muhammad Saalih al-Munajjid, the supervisor of this site."

Popularity
According to the website Similarweb, islamqa.info had 10.1 million visits in January 2022, down from 13.66 million visits in March 2021, similar to 10 million visits per month in October and November 2020. Similarweb ranked islamqa 205th in the world in the category of "Community and Society > Faith and Beliefs" websites  in January 2022, down from sixth in the world in the category in March 2021. While it was the highest ranking Islamic website in March 2021, as of January 2022 it ranks behind Islamweb.net at 17.2 million visits. Alexa rated it as the 8157th most popular website globally, 3 March 2022; 7,612th  in "global engagement", 15 March 2022.

Contents 
IslamQA is available in 16 languages, including English, Arabic, Urdu, Hindi, Turkish, German, Bangla, Chinese, Russian, French, and Spanish, the website provides fatawa covering basic tenets of faith, etiquette and morals, Islamic history, and Islamic politics.

The site describes itself in the following manner:

The site's vision is to be "an encyclopaedia about Islam". Its aims (as described on the website) are:

Methodology
The site describes its methodology as such:

Controversy in Saudi Arabia
The website was banned in Saudi Arabia because it was issuing independent fatwas. In Saudi Arabia, the kingdom's Council of Senior Scholars has sole responsibility for issuing fatwas. The council was granted this exclusive authority to issue fatwas by a royal edict issued in August 2010 (while restrictions had been in place since 2005, they were seldom enforced); this move was described by Christopher Boucek as "the latest example of how the state is working to assert its primacy over the country’s religious establishment."

See also

References

External links 
 

Islamic political websites
Internet properties established in 1997
Fatwas
Saudi Arabian websites
Salafi movement
Multilingual websites